Blackleg, blacklegs or black-legged may refer to:

Disease
 Blackleg (disease), in sheep and cattle
 Blackleg (Brassica) in rapeseed and other mustard-and-cabbage-family plants, caused by fungus Leptosphaeria maculans  
 Blackleg (potatoes), caused by Pectobacterium carotovorum
 Blackleg (geraniums), caused by a form of the quasi-fungus Pythium
 Scurvy, vitamin deficiency in primates and some other animals

Species
 Black-leg, a common name for the polypore fungus Royoporus badius
 Black-legged kittiwake, seagull species
 Black-legged seriema, seriema bird species
 Blackleg tortoiseshell, another name for the large tortoiseshell butterfly
 Animals named as black-legged
 Black-legged tick, Ixodes scapularis and Ixodes pacificus

Other uses 
 Blacklegs (horse), a racehorse
 Appalousa tribe
 Blackleg labour (or strikebreaking)
 Card sharp
 Operation Blackleg, dive operation on warship HMS Coventry (D118)

See also
 Blackley, Manchester, England
 Blackledge (disambiguation)
 Black Legion (disambiguation)

Animal common name disambiguation pages